Jan Christer Ragnar Josefsson (born 27 June 1952) is a Swedish investigative journalist who has had numerous shows on Sveriges Television such as Fittja Paradiso, Uppdrag Granskning and Debatt. Uppdrag Granskning has uncovered some of Sweden's most noted scandals such as the ICA meat repackaging controversy, and have both received journalistic prizes and attracted criticism for e.g. biased reporting.

Bibliography

References 

1957 births
Swedish journalists
Living people